Santiago Gómez Cora (born July 25, 1978) is a former rugby sevens player for Argentina. He held the career record for number of tries scored on the IRB Sevens World Series circuit with 230 until May 21, 2016 when Kenyan Collins injera took the spot. He also ranks among the top five players in career points and in appearances.

Gómez Cora also played full-back for the Pumas in fifteens. In March 2008 it was confirmed he would move to Welsh club Ospreys.

Coaching
In September 2013, Gómez Cora became head coach of the Argentina national rugby sevens team.  Gómez Cora has previously coached the Argentina women's rugby sevens team. In addition to his duties with Argentina's national teams, he works with Serevi Rugby, a training and development program founded by Fiji legend Waisale Serevi; he is based in Buenos Aires and operates the organization's Latin American efforts.

References

External links
 Translated version of player profile
 
 
 

1978 births
Living people
Argentine rugby union players
Argentina international rugby sevens players
Male rugby sevens players
Argentina international rugby union players
Argentine rugby union coaches
Coaches of international rugby sevens teams